Nesar Ahmed is a Bangladesh Awami League politician and the incumbent Jatiya Sangsad member representing the Moulvibazar-3 constituency.

Career
Ahmed was elected to parliament from Moulvibazar-3 as a Bangladesh Awami League candidate 30 December 2018. He is the president of Moulvibazar District unit of Bangladesh Awami League.

References

Living people
People from Moulvibazar District
Awami League politicians
11th Jatiya Sangsad members
Year of birth missing (living people)
Place of birth missing (living people)